The 2007 NBA Europe Live Tour was a basketball exhibition tour featuring teams from the NBA and teams from Europe's top professional leagues, as part of the NBA Global Games. The hosting countries were England, Italy, Spain and Turkey. The NBA teams traveled to Europe to begin their training camps, and played a series of exhibition matches against the European teams, and preseason games against other NBA teams. The games took place from October 6 to October 11 and the NBA teams prevailed 5 games to 2 over the European teams.

Teams
The four NBA teams that participated and the locations of their training camps:
 Boston Celtics, Rome
 Toronto Raptors, Treviso
 Memphis Grizzlies, Málaga
 Minnesota Timberwolves, Istanbul

The European participants:
 Efes Pilsen, TBL 
 Lottomatica Roma, Serie A (2nd participation) 
 Unicaja Málaga, ACB
 Real Madrid, ACB
 Estudiantes, ACB

Games

Notes
The participating teams were announced before Kevin Garnett was traded from the Minnesota Timberwolves to the Boston Celtics, the meeting between his current and former team was coincidental.
The Boston Celtics were the only team not to play against a FIBA opponent.
Toronto Raptors forwards Andrea Bargnani and Jorge Garbajosa played for Benetton Treviso before coming to the NBA. Jorge Garbajosa played for Unicaja Málaga as well.

Trivia
 The Grizzlies' loss to Unicaja Málaga and the Raptors' loss to Real Madrid marked the 2nd and 3rd losses, out of 4 games, by NBA franchises to ACB Spanish teams since the beginning of NBA Global Games in 2006.
 The Grizzlies' loss to Unicaja Málaga and the Raptors' loss to Real Madrid marked the 7th and 8th losses by NBA franchises to Euroleague teams since 1978.
 Only Maccabi Tel Aviv (4 times: 1978, 1984 twice, 2005), the Soviet Union National Team (1988), FC Barcelona (2006) and CSKA Moscow (2006) had won against an NBA team before.

Related links
 List of NBA versus international games
 McDonald's Championship

External links
 NBA Europe Live Tour 2007

NBA Global Games
Europe
2007–08 Euroleague